Ledro (in local dialect: Léder) is an Italian comune (municipality) in Trentino in northern Italy. It was created on January 1, 2010, by the union of the former comuni of Pieve di Ledro, Bezzecca, Concei, Molina di Ledro, Tiarno di Sopra and Tiarno di Sotto.

History

The municipality was created after a referendum, called on November 30, 2008, in all the 6 comuni of the Ledro Valley.

Geography
The municipality counts the civil parishes (frazioni) of Bezzecca, Biacesa, Concei, Enguiso, Legos, Lenzumo, Locca, Mezzolago, Molina di Ledro, Pieve di Ledro (the municipal seat), Pré di Ledro, Tiarno di Sopra, Tiarno di Sotto.

Ledro borders with the municipalities of Bleggio Superiore, Bondone, Cimego, Condino, Fiavè, Limone sul Garda (BS), Magasa (BS), Nago-Torbole, Riva del Garda, Pieve di Bono, Storo, Tenno, Tione di Trento, Tremosine (BS) and Zuclo.

Main sights
Lake Ledro, not too far from the Lake Garda
Giardino Botanico Preistorico di Molina di Ledro, a botanical garden of Bronze Age food plants

Personalities
Andrea Maffei

Twin municipalities
  Müllheim, Germany
  Buštěhrad, Czech Republic
  Doksy, Czech Republic
  Chyňava, Czech Republic
  Milín, Czech Republic
  Nový Knín, Czech Republic
  Příbram, Czech Republic
  Ptice, Czech Republic
  Všeň, Czech Republic

World heritage site
It is home to one or more prehistoric pile-dwelling (or stilt house) settlements that are part of the Prehistoric Pile dwellings around the Alps UNESCO World Heritage Site.

References

External links

 Ledro official municipal website
Coat of arms of the new municipality